Dropping the Pilot is a political cartoon by Sir John Tenniel, first published in the British magazine Punch on 29 March 1890. It depicts Chancellor Otto von Bismarck as a maritime pilot who is stepping off a ship, perhaps a reference to Plato's ship of state, idly and unconcernedly watched by a young Wilhelm II, German Emperor. Bismarck had resigned as Chancellor at Wilhelm's demand just ten days earlier on 19 March because of political differences.

After the cartoon's publication, Tenniel received a commission from the 5th Earl of Rosebery to create a copy to be sent to Bismarck himself. The former chancellor reportedly replied, "It is indeed a fine one".

The cartoon is well known in Germany and often used in history textbooks and school books, under the title The Pilot Leaves the Ship.

Adaptations

 Dropping the pilot, referring to Kaiser Wilhelm's removal from the list of Royal Navy admirals in 1914, by David Low
 Dropping the pilot, referring to Winston Churchill, by Daniel Bishop
 Cartoon Dropping the Pilots showing Khrushchev looking down as the four "Pilots" leave the ship of state.
 Cartoon showing the pilot Abraham Lincoln being "Dropped" from the "Grand Old Party" By Captain Barry Goldwater
 Cartoon showing Margaret Thatcher being "Dropped as the Pilot"
 Steve Bell of The Guardian has adapted the cartoon:
 Vice-president faces isolation after key ally leaves Pentagon
 Iraqis celebrate the withdrawal of American combat troops
 David Cameron's response to Coulson's guilt
Dropping the pornbot (Resignation of Damian Green)
 Martin Rowson of The Guardian has also adapted the cartoon repeatedly: 
 Steve Hilton's Exit
 Undropping the Pilot
 The resignation of Michael Flynn
Dropping The Pilate on the resignation of Liz Truss after only 45 days in office

References

External link 

1890 works
Cultural depictions of Otto von Bismarck
Cultural depictions of Wilhelm II
Editorial cartoons
Works originally published in Punch (magazine)